Gianmarco Busca (born 30 November 1965 in Edolo) is the bishop of the Roman Catholic Diocese of Mantua, Italy.

Biography 
Busca was ordinated priest on June 8, 1991 and was incardinated in the Roman Catholic Diocese of Brescia. From 1994 to 1999 he was studying theology in Pontifical Gregorian University in Rome. He was appointed a bishop of Mantua on June 3, 2016 by Pope Francis. He received his episcopal consecration on September 11, 2016 and was installed in the diocese on October 2, 2016.

References

Sources 
 Profile of Mons. Busca on catholic-hierarchy
 Profile of Mons. Busca on Gcatholic

1965 births
Living people
Bishops of Mantua
21st-century Italian Roman Catholic bishops